This is a list of monuments that are classified by the Moroccan ministry of culture around Tiznit.

Monuments and sites in Tiznit 

|}

References 

Tiznit
Tiznit Province